For the Eurovision Song Contest 1972, Sweden chose their entrant in a national selection called Melodifestivalen 1972. About 1,000 entries were submitted, and Sveriges Radio picked 10 of them for the final. Family Four, last year's representative, won, again with "Härliga sommardag", a song written by Håkan Elmquist.

Before Eurovision

Melodifestivalen 1972 
Melodifestivalen 1972 was the selection for the 13th song to represent Sweden at the Eurovision Song Contest. It was the 12th time that this system of picking a song had been used. Approximately 1,000 songs were submitted to Sveriges Radio for the competition. The final was held in the Cirkus in Stockholm on 12 February 1972, presented by Gunilla Marcus and was broadcast on TV1 but was not broadcast on radio.

At Eurovision 
At ESC, they finished 13th (out of 18).

Voting

References

External links
ESCSweden.com (in Swedish)
Information site about Melodifestivalen
Eurovision Song Contest National Finals

1972
Countries in the Eurovision Song Contest 1972
1972
Eurovision
Eurovision